Bombo is a platform game released by British video game publisher Rino for the Commodore 64 in 1985. It is a clone of the Tekhan arcade game Bomb Jack, the official Commodore 64 port of which was released earlier the same year.

The music was composed by Ben Daglish. One of the songs is based on The Hootchy Kootchy Dance.

Plot

Taken from the game's instructions:

A wave of insurrection has left the earth littered with bombs primed to explode and destroy mankind. Your commission is to clear the pyramids of ancient Egypt, castles of medieval Britain and hustling, bustling modern day New York City of this danger before their history becomes just a history. Hurry time is not on your side, neither are the many enemies left to harass you.

Gameplay
Taken from the game's instructions:

References

1986 video games
Commodore 64 games
Commodore 64-only games
Platform games
Video game clones
Video games scored by Ben Daglish
Video games developed in the United Kingdom